State Road 458 is a short one-mile (1.6 km) route in Lawrence County.

Route description
State Road 458 begins at State Road 158 about a mile west of Bedford and runs directly north.  It passes Lena Carver Road on the left, then Dark Hollow Road on the right, before terminating at Purdue Farm Road.  It connects State Road 158 with the Dark Hollow community.

History 
SR 458 was signed SR 158, before SR 58 was rerouted to its current  location.

Major intersections

References

External links

458
Transportation in Lawrence County, Indiana